Youth is a category of athletics in which athletes compete under the age of 18 years. Countries all around the world compete in athletics. World Youth Athletics Competitions are held every 2 years which contain the best Youth competitors in the world.

Description and development
The principle behind the category is to introduce young people into athletics. Participators in the competitions in this class may be athletes who have not completed their eighteenth year on 31 December of the year the competition occurs.

Competitions

Championships
IAAF World U18 Championships, organized by the IAAF every 2 years
European Athletics Youth Championships, organized by the EAA every 2 years
African Youth Athletics Championships
Asian Youth Athletics Championships
Central American and Caribbean Youth Championships in Athletics
Pan American Youth Athletics Championships
Oceania Youth Athletics Championships, organized by the OAA every 2 years

Games
Youth Olympic Games
African Youth Games

See also
List of world youth bests in athletics
International Association of Athletics Federations
European Athletic Association
Under-20 athletics
Under-23 athletics

References

External links
IWAS World Youth Games - IWASF

 
Age categories in athletics